Producer Entertainment Group (PEG), also affiliated with Producer Entertainment Group Records (PEGR), is an American talent management firm and production company based in Burbank, California. The group manages LGBTQ+ talent across the globe, including past competitors of RuPaul's Drag Race and RuPaul's Drag Race: UK.

History 
The company was founded in 2011 by David Charpentier and Jacob Slane, and is managed by them along with Ryan Aceto.

In 2014 PEG launched the first official RuPaul's Drag Race world tour, Battle of the Seasons, which featured a lineup of RuPaul's Drag Race stars and ran through 2016, visiting over 60 cities around the world.

In 2017, performer Adore Delano filed a lawsuit against the company, alleging that they had embezzled millions of dollars that were owed to her from appearance fees, record sales, and concerts. PEG denied the allegations and retaliated with a countersuit against Delano. The suit was dismissed by a judge who awarded no money to either party.

Between 2018 and 2019, PEG partnered with talent agencies Clear Talent Group and The Benedetti Group (fka Executive PR and Talent) and was labeled a "super firm" by The Hollywood Reporter. In 2019 PEG also announced a music distribution deal with Warner Music Group’s Alternative Distribution Alliance. During this time, PEG Records also released the first Billboard #1 charting album from a drag artist. 

In 2020, as a response to the COVID-19 pandemic entertainment shutdown, PEG announced Digital Drag Fest, an online drag and LGBT festival that included a partnership with the Grammy Museum. PEG also partnered with talent agency ICM Partners to jointly represent clients including Bob the Drag Queen, Katya Zamolodchikova and Trixie Mattel.

In March 2021, PEG announced a joint venture with OMG Media, a Canadian broadcaster, to launch OUTtv USA, Apple TV's first LGBTQ streaming channel.

Roster 
They are listed in alphabetical order.
 Alaska 5000
 BeBe Zahara Benet
 BenDeLaCreme
 Brandon Stansell
 Bob the Drag Queen
 Darienne Lake
 Desmond is Amazing
 Divina de Campo
 Ginger Minj
 Jackie Beat
 Jiggly Caliente
 Jinkx Monsoon
 Jujubee
 Kahanna Montrese
 Katya Zamolodchikova
 Lady Bunny
 Major Scales
 Manila Luzon
 Michelle Visage
 Miss Fame
 Miz Cracker
 Monét X Change
 Peppermint
 Sharon Needles
 Sherry Vine
 Thorgy Thor
 Trinity the Tuck
 Trixie Mattel

References

American record labels
Drag (clothing)-related mass media
LGBT-related music
Talent agencies
2011 establishments in the United States